Frederick Walter Hyndman (February 13, 1904 – October 12, 1995) was an insurance company executive and political figure on Prince Edward Island. He served as the 18th Lieutenant Governor of Prince Edward Island from March 1958 to August 1963.

He was born in Charlottetown, the son of Walter Eardley Hyndman and Winnifred Sarah Cotton, and was educated at Prince of Wales College. In 1934, Hyndman married Norah Cecile Shannon. He served as a major during World War II. Hyndman ran unsuccessfully for a seat in the provincial assembly in the riding of 5th Queens in 1955.

He was president of Hyndman & Company Ltd (established in 1872).

References 
 The Honourable Frederick Walter Hyndman, Lieutenant Governor Gallery, Government of Prince Edward Island

1904 births
1995 deaths
Lieutenant Governors of Prince Edward Island
People from Charlottetown